Lishak (also Romanized as Līshak) is a village in Khara Rud Rural District, in the Central District of Siahkal County, Gilan Province, Iran. At the 2006 census, its population was 265, in 58 families.

References 

Populated places in Siahkal County